John L. Morrison was the founder of the controversial Duluth, Minnesota newspaper Ripsaw.

John L. Morrison may also refer to:

 John L. Morrison (pioneer) (1819–1899), namesake of Morrison Street in Portland, Oregon
 John Lowrie Morrison (born 1948), Scottish artist